Captured in Time and Space is the first live album of Christian rock band Petra. The concert was re-released on DVD in 2006.

This was the last Petra album to feature Greg X. Volz as lead vocalist.

Track listing
Vinyl release

CD release

Track information
 This is the third Petra album to feature the song "God Gave Rock and Roll to You". The song was written by Russ Ballard and covered by KISS and twice by Petra.
 The song "Hallelujah Chorus" was originally written by George Frideric Handel.  It was originally part of a masterpiece known as Messiah.
 Between "Godpleaser" and "It Is Finished" there was a song cut out of the CD and LP versions that only exists on the cassette version. It was an improvised song known as "The Great I Am". This recorded concert was the only time it was ever performed.  The cover of the CD version refers to it, advertising a "bonus song" that isn't actually included.
 The talking in between songs is different on the CD version in a couple of places as compared to the LP version, particularly before the last song where a minute or so has been cut out and several minutes newly added (taken from the cassette version).
 The UK vinyl release omits the talking between "Godpleaser" and "It Is Finished" completely.

Personnel 
Petra
 Greg X. Volz – lead vocals
 Bob Hartman – electric, acoustic and synthesized guitars, backing vocals
 John Lawry – keyboards, backing vocals
 Mark Kelly – bass, backing vocals, keyboard bass
 Louie Weaver – acoustic and electronic drums

Production
 Jonathan David Brown – producer
 Tim Norris – special CD editor

Recording
 Recorded by Jonathan David Brown
 Remote recording facilities by Reelsound Recording Co., Austin, Texas
 Assistant engineers & set up crew - Malcolm Harper, Mason Harlow & Gordon Garrison
 Re-recorded at Fireside Studios, Nashville, Tennessee
 Re-mixed at Mama Jo's Recording Studio, North Hollywood, California
 Assisted by Todd Van Etten
 Edited at Rivendell Recorders, Pasadena, Texas with thanks to Chuck Sugar, Bret Hurst & Steve Dady
 Mastered at Future Disc Systems by Steve Hall
 Civic Auditorium, Knoxville, Tennessee – November 21, 1985
 Memorial Auditorium, Greenville, South Carolina – November 22, 1985
 Township Auditorium, Columbia, South Carolina – November 23, 1985

References

Petra (band) albums
1986 live albums